Kamachal-e Bala Mahalleh (also Romanized as Kamāchāl-e Bālā Maḩalleh; also known as Kamā Chāl, Komā Chāl, and Koma Chal Chai) is a village in Kisom Rural District, in the Central District of Astaneh-ye Ashrafiyeh County, Gilan Province, Iran. At the 2006 census, its population was 636, in 194 families.

References 

Populated places in Astaneh-ye Ashrafiyeh County